Silke Nowitzki (born July 12, 1974, in Würzburg, West Germany) is a German former international basketball player. 

In 1993 Nowitzki and her women's team for DJK Würzburg were promoted into the first German basketball division. She made her debut for the Germany women's national basketball team in 1995. She played with DJK Würzburg in the 1998 Ronchetti Cup.

In 2001 Nowitzki went to New York and started working for the NBA in international TV. Between 2003 and 2005 she studied business economics in San Diego. In the summer of 2006, she became manager for her brother Dirk.

References

External links
Silke Nowitzki at fibaeurope.com

1974 births
Living people
German women's basketball players
Sportspeople from Würzburg